The Matachewan dike swarm is a large 2,500 to 2,450 million year old Paleoproterozoic dike swarm of Northern Ontario, Canada. It consists of basaltic dikes that were intruded in greenschist, granite-greenstone, and metamorphosed sedimentary terrains of the Superior Craton of the Canadian Shield.

See also
 Matachewan hotspot

References

dike swarms
igneous petrology of Ontario
Paleoproterozoic magmatism